North Waltham is a village and civil parish in the borough of Basingstoke and Deane in Hampshire, England. In the 2011 Census it had a population of 870. The village is home to a pond, shop, Victorian primary school, a recreation ground and two pubs: The Fox, and The Wheatsheaf. The Church of England Parish Church is dedicated to St Michael.

Governance
The village and civil parish are part of the Oakley and North Waltham ward of the borough of Basingstoke and Deane. In turn, the ward falls within the North West Hampshire constituency.

Geography
Nearby towns and cities: Andover, Basingstoke, Newbury, Salisbury, Winchester

Nearby villages: Axford, Cliddesden, Dummer, Farleigh Wallop, Hook, Kingsclere, Oakley, Old Basing, Overton, Steventon.

Further reading
 Tanner, Richard St Michael’s Church, North Waltham: A New Guide St Michael's Church, 2000, 8pp

References

External links

 North Waltham village website
 North Waltham Village Trust
 North Waltham Parish Council
 

North Waltham
Civil parishes in Basingstoke and Deane